Baddi is an industrial town and Nagar parishad in the southwestern Solan district of Himachal Pradesh, India. The town lies on the border of Himachal Pradesh and Haryana states in the Shivalik Hills, around 35 kilometres west of Solan town.

Geography
The town is situated at an average elevation of 426 metres (1397 ft).

Demographics
According to the 2011 Census of India, Baddi town had a population of 29,911 with 19,332 males and 10,579 females. There were 3,883 children below the age of six years. The sex ratio and child sex ratio of the town stood at 547 and 831 respectively. The literacy rate was 86.33%, higher than the state average of 82.80%.

Economy 
Baddi is home to multiple pharmaceutical companies which have established manufacturing plants and R&D hubs in the town. The town is Asia's biggest Pharmaceuticals hub and is home to some of the largest pharmaceutical companies including Cipla, Dr. Reddy's Laboratories, Cadila Healthcare, Torrent Pharmaceuticals, Abbott Laboratories, Glenmark Pharmaceuticals, and Manjushree Technopack.

Baddi houses a total of 3,120 factories belonging to leading pharma,  FMCG and textile companies among others and which generate an annual turnover of Rs 60,000 crore. Baddi employs one-third of all persons engaged in Himachal's medium and large industries. In terms of revenue, the town contributes half of the state's total revenues generated from industries. In April, 2019, the department of commerce undertook inauguration of Engineering Exports Promotion Council office in Nalagarh inaugurated by Mr. Prashant Deshta- Sub-Divisional Magistrate Nalagarh (SDM) to ease up International Export in the region.

Education
Educational institutes in and nearby Baddi are: 
 Baddi University of Emerging Sciences and Technologies
 IEC University
ICFAI University
Bhojia Dental College
maharaja Agrasen University

References 

Cities and towns in Solan district